The Lacs is an American country rap duo that consists of Clay "Uncle Snap" Sharpe and Brian "Rooster" King. At first, the group also featured Brandon Herndon on the three self-released albums on Side Ya Mouth Records.

The Lacs have recorded six albums for Backroad Records, a subsidiary of Average Joes Entertainment, an independent label co-owned by fellow country rap artist Colt Ford. Four albums have entered the Billboard 200: Keep it Redneck (2013), Outlaw in Me and American Rebelution (2017).

The Lacs created their own record label Dirt Rock Empire in 2017. On September 22, 2017, The Lacs released the first album from Dirt Rock titled Dirtbagz, Vol. 1 which is a compilation album featuring many of the labels artists such as Nate Kenyon, Crucifix and Hard Target.

Discography

Albums

Singles

Other certified songs

Guest singles

Music videos

References

External links

Average Joes Entertainment artists
American hip hop groups
American country music groups
Country music duos
Musical groups from Georgia (U.S. state)
Musical groups established in 2011
Country rap musicians
Country musicians from Georgia (U.S. state)
2011 establishments in Georgia (U.S. state)